Central Point School District 6 is a school district in the U.S. state of Oregon that operates schools in the communities of Central Point, Gold Hill and Sams Valley.  The district is bordered directly to the south by the Medford School District, the largest school district in southern Oregon.

Demographics
In the 2009 school year, the district had 72 students classified as homeless by the Department of Education, or 2.4% of students in the district.

Schools

Elementary schools
Central Point Elementary School (Mascot: Roadrunner) - Central Point
Jewett Elementary School (Mascot: Jaguar) - Central Point
Mae Richardson Elementary School (Mascot: Ram) - Central Point
Patrick Elementary School (Mascot: Panther) - Gold Hill
Sams Valley Elementary School (Mascot: Hawk) - Sams Valley

Middle schools
Hanby Middle School (Mascot: Husky) - Gold Hill
Scenic Middle School (Mascot: Spartan) - Central Point

High schools
Crater High School (Mascot: Comet) - Central Point

See also
Medford School District
List of school districts in Oregon

References

External links
Central Point School District 6 (official website)

School districts in Oregon
Education in Jackson County, Oregon
Central Point, Oregon